Nilson is both a surname and a given name. Notable people with the name include:

Surname
Anton Nilson (1887–1989), Swedish militant socialist
Carlos Nilson, one of the members of the beat and rock band Los Naufragos
Cynthia Nilson. songwriter and singer from Buenos Aires, Argentina
Gunnar Nilson (1872–1951), Swedish physician
Johan Ernst Nilson, Swedish explorer interested in environmental and climate-related issues
John Nilson, Canadian politician in Saskatchewan
Lars Fredrik Nilson (1840–1899), Swedish chemist who discovered scandium in 1879
Lawrence Nilson, the Commander-in-chief of Bombay from 6 January 1785 to 6 September 1788
Marcus Nilson (born 1978), Swedish professional ice hockey player
Mitch Nilsson (born 1991), Australian professional baseball player
Peter Nilson (1937–1998), Swedish astronomer and novelist

Given name
Nílson (footballer, born 1965), Nilson Esidio Mora, Brazilian football forward
Nicole Nilson Schaffrich (born 1970), on the American version of the reality TV show Big Brother 2, broadcast in 2001
Nilson (footballer, born 1975), Nilson Corrêia Júnior, Brazilian football goalkeeper
Nilson Cortes (born 1977), Colombian football striker
Nilson (footballer, born 1987), Nilson Taty Sousa Vaz, Santomean footballer goalkeeper
Nilson (footballer, born 1989), Nilson Ricardo da Silva Junior, Brazilian football defensive midfielder
Nilson (footballer, born 1991), José Nilson dos Santos Silva, Brazilian football striker
Nilson (born 1990), Nilson Cain, American Applications Developer and Kayaking Prodigy

See also
Nilson Nelson Gymnasium, an indoor sporting arena in Brasília, Brazil
The Adventures of Nilson Groundthumper and Hermy, a comic series by Stan Sakai
Nilsson